Marcin Kuszewski (born 19 May 1977) is a Polish hurdler. He competed in the men's 110 metres hurdles at the 2000 Summer Olympics.

References

1977 births
Living people
Athletes (track and field) at the 2000 Summer Olympics
Polish male hurdlers
Olympic athletes of Poland
Place of birth missing (living people)
20th-century Polish people